Koněšín is a municipality and village in Třebíč District in the Vysočina Region of the Czech Republic. It has about 500 inhabitants.

Geography
It lies in the Jevišovice Uplands. In the west and south, the municipal border is formed by the Jihlava River and by the Dalešice Reservoir built on it.

History
The first written mention of Koněšín is from 1104, when a marketplace was located there. Until 1557, it was property of the monastery in Třebíč. After 1557, it was a part of the Náměšť nad Oslavou estate.

Demographics

Sights
The landmark of Koněšín is the Church of Saint Bartholomew. It is an early Baroque church from 1663–1679 with a Romanesque core. The prismatic tower was added in 1729.

References

External links

Villages in Třebíč District